The Kid: Chamaco is a 2009 Mexican drama film directed by Miguel Necoechea and starring Martin Sheen and Michael Madsen.  It is Necoechea's directorial debut.

Cast
Martin Sheen as Dr. Frank Irwin
Kirk Harris as Jimmy "The Dream" Irwin
Álex Perea as Abner Torres
Michael Madsen as Willie
Danny Perea as Silvana Torres
Gustavo Sánchez Parra as Rigoberto Torres
Raúl Méndez as Officer Manuel Quintana
Sofía Espinosa as Paulina
Marco Antonio Barrera as himself

Production
The film was shot in Mexico City for five weeks.

References

External links
 
 

2000s English-language films
2000s Spanish-language films
Mexican drama films
2009 directorial debut films
2009 films
Films shot in Mexico City
2009 drama films
2000s Mexican films